Mohamed Mansour (born January 1948) is an Egyptian born billionaire businessman and former politician.  He is the chairman of Mansour Group, a US$6 billion conglomerate. In November 2019, Forbes estimated his wealth at $2.9 billion.

Early life
Mohamed Mansour was born into one of the most prominent business families in Alexandria.  The family business, Mansour Group, controls nine of Egypt's top Fortune 500 companies, though it needed to survive the nationalization and confiscation of its assets in 1965.

Mansour gained an engineering degree from North Carolina State University in 1968, and a master's in business administration from Auburn University in 1971, teaching there until 1973.

Career
With his two brothers, Mansour maintained an active role in the Mansour Group, the family business, building close ties as distributors for US companies including Chevrolet, Marlboro, General Motors and Caterpillar. Some of his other interests include Metro, the largest Egyptian supermarket chain, and McDonald's franchises in Egypt.

Mansour has led the group since his father died in 1976.  Since then, he has overseen all the major corporate developments, including setting up the company's private investment subsidiary Man Capital in London.

In January 2006 Mansour resigned his business responsibilities to serve as minister of transport. He resigned in October 2009 after a deadly train crash.

In December 2022, it was announced he would become senior treasurer for the UK Conservative Party. In February 2023, Mansour agreed to a multimillion pound tax settlement following an investigation into Mansour Group subsidiary Unatrac by HM Revenue and Customs.

Personal life
He is married with two children, and lives in Mayfair, London. 

As of February 2023, Mansour has donated £600k to the Conservative Party.

References

External links
 Profile of Mohamed Mansour at forbes.com

1948 births
Living people
Businesspeople from Cairo
Egyptian billionaires
Transport ministers of Egypt
North Carolina State University alumni
Auburn University alumni